Ectopsocus meridionalis is a species of outer barklouse in the family Ectopsocidae. It is found in Africa, the Caribbean, Europe and Northern Asia (excluding China), Central America, North America, Oceania, South America, and Southern Asia.

References

Further reading

 
 
 

Ectopsocidae